Roger Laporte (20 July 1925, Lyon – 24 April 2001 Montpellier) was a 20th-century French writer.

Works 
1963: La Veille, Éditions Gallimard, series "Le Chemin"
1966: Une voix de fin silence, Gallimard, series "Le Chemin"
1967: Pourquoi ? (Une voix de fin silence II), Gallimard, series "Le Chemin"
1970: Fugue, biographie, Gallimard, series "Le Chemin"
1973: Fugue. Supplément, biographie, Gallimard, series "Le Chemin"
1973: Deux lectures de Maurice Blanchot (with Bernard Noël), Fata Morgana, series "Le Grand Pal", Montpellier
1974: Une migration et Le partenaire, Fata Morgana, 1974 (texts published in magazines in 1959 and 1960, lettre-préface by René Char)
1975: Quinze variations sur un thème biographique, Flammarion, series "Textes"
1976: Fugue 3, Flammarion
1979: Carnets (extraits), Hachette, series "POL"
1979: Souvenirs de Reims and other tales,  Hachette, series "POL", Prix France Culture
1979: Suite, biographie, Hachette, series "POL"
1983: Moriendo, biographie, P.O.L
1986: Une vie, biographie, P.O.L
1986: Écrire la musique, A Passage
1986: Hölderlin une douleur éperdue. Seyssel (Ain) : Editions 
1988: Entre deux mondes (with 17 photographs by François Lagarde), Gris banal
1989: Lettre à personne (with an avant-propos de Philippe Lacoue-Labarthe and a postface by Maurice Blanchot), Plon
1990: Quelques petits riens, Ulysse fin de siècle
1991: Études, P.O.L
1994: A l’extrême pointe : Proust, Bataille, Blanchot, Fata Morgana, Montpellier
1997: La Loi de l’alternance, Fourbis
2000: Variations sur des carnets, 
2002: Le Carnet, Léo Scheer

Studies 
2006: Pour Roger Laporte, under the direction of François Dominique: texts by Marcel Cohen, Michel Deguy, Jacques Derrida, Jean Frémon, Frédéric-Yves Jeannet, Pierre Madaule, Bernard Noël, Michel Surya, Alain Veinstein, Jean-Jacques Viton, 
2010: Michel Surya, Excepté le possible : Jacques Dupin, Roger Laporte, Bernard Noël, fissile éditions

External links 
 Article on 'Encyclopædia universalis
 Article sur Remue.net by Philippe Rahmy

20th-century French non-fiction writers
Prix France Culture winners
1925 births
Writers from Lyon
2001 deaths